Roberto Blanco (born 26 November 1938) is an Argentine former footballer who competed in the 1960 Summer Olympics.

References

1938 births
Living people
Association football midfielders
Argentine footballers
Olympic footballers of Argentina
Footballers at the 1960 Summer Olympics
Racing Club de Avellaneda footballers
Pan American Games medalists in football
Pan American Games gold medalists for Argentina
Footballers at the 1959 Pan American Games
Medalists at the 1959 Pan American Games